Ghana is an administrative ward in the Mbeya Urban district of the Mbeya Region of Tanzania. In 2016 the Tanzania National Bureau of Statistics report there were 5,384 people in the ward, from 4,885 in 2012.

Neighborhoods 
The ward has 3 neighborhoods Ghana Magharibi, Ghana Mashariki, and Mbata.

References 

Wards of Mbeya Region